Delitzsch (Slavic: delč or delcz for hill) is a town in Saxony in Germany, 20 km north of Leipzig and 30 km east of Halle (Saale). With 24,850 inhabitants at the end of 2015, it is the largest town in the district of Nordsachsen.

Archaeological evidence outside the town limits points to a settlement dating from the Neolithic Age. The first documented mention of Delitzsch dates from 1166 and it later became the Elector of Saxony's residence in the 17th and 18th centuries. The old town is well preserved, with several plazas, citizens' and patrician houses, towers, a baroque castle and the town's fortifications.

Delitzsch and its surrounding area contain water areas, hiking and cycling networks and nature reserves.

Geography

Location 
Delitzsch is located in the northwestern part of Nordsachsen in Saxony, at an altitude of 94 meters above sea level. Due to its location on the border with Saxony-Anhalt, Delitzsch is the northernmost town in Saxony. It is situated on the north heath and recreation area Goitzsche which extends across the Saxony-Saxony-Anhalt border to Bitterfeld-Wolfen. To the east is the spa town of Bad Düben, which is the starting point for the Düben Heath.

The adjacent communities are Löbnitz, Schönwölkau, Rackwitz and Neukyhna clockwise called from the north of town.

Districts

History 
Delitzsch was founded as a town around 1200 AD (according to chronicles) and became recognized as a city in 1300 AD.  Both before and after its founding, the city fought off many invaders: first the Slavic tribes who had lived there before the city was founded and then, later, in the Thirty Years' War (1618-1648), the Swedes.  A legend arose from this final encounter with the Swedes, saying that when the Swedes reached the river Lober, the tower warden's daughter spied them and blew a trumpet, allowing the citizens of the town to get to safety and prepare, and as a result the invaders were defeated.  Every year there is a historical medieval style fair to celebrate this victory over the Swedes and, during the fair, shops are open on Sundays.

As a result of the Congress of Vienna in 1814-15, Delitzsch was granted to Prussia from the Kingdom of Saxony. A district of Delitzsch was established for administrative purposes.

In World War II (1939 - 1945), only one building, the station, was burned, minimal damage in comparison with many other German urban centers.

According to a 1996 census, Delitzsch had more than 27,000 inhabitants.

Historical population

1747 - 1999 
(using town boundaries as at the time)

¹ Census 
² Merging districts

Source: Statistisches Landesamt des Freistaates Sachsen

2000 - present 
(using town boundaries as at the time)

¹ Merging districts

Source: Statistisches Landesamt des Freistaates Sachsen

Politics

Town council 
The town council consists of the lord mayor and 30 town councillors. Every five years, the town council is chosen anew. The inaugural meeting of newly elected council always takes place in the conference hall of the city hall. The current council has been in place since the last local election (held on 26 May 2019), and is constituted as follows:

The next council elections are scheduled for 2024.

Mayor 
 Arno Erhardt: 1945
 Richard Hampe: 1945-1950
 Paul Heinze: 1951-1952
 Walter Lange: 1952-1956
 Rudolf Kunath: 1956-1959
 Otto Paul: 1960-1973
 Hans-Joachim Kumrow: 1973-1977
 Wolfgang Neubert: 1977-1979
 Karl Lubienski: 1979-1990
 Heinz Bieniek: 1990-2008

Historian Manfred Wilde (born 1962) won the mayoral election in 2008 with 60.2 percent of the votes cast.

Coat of Arms 
The emblem of the town Delitzsch combines two different arms, the house of Wettin or tribal emblem and the County of the Mark Meissen. It shows two upright poles blue (Landsberger piles) that are in a golden box, and this split in three parts. In the middle of the main shield of the emblem can be seen in an inclined position as a means to shield Meissen black lion on a golden shield. The middle blade is tilted forward, and so the lion appears as upright as possible, or borders. He has two tail tuft, with their division begins in the middle of the tail, which should point to the Mark Meissen County. As an accessory, the coat of arms (1526 introduced) a fluttering ribbon bearing the inscription: "Secretum civium in delitzsch" (loosely translated: Privy Seal of Delitzsch).

Twin towns – sister cities

Delitzsch is twinned with:
 Friedrichshafen, Germany (1990)
 Monheim am Rhein, Germany (1990)
 Ostrów Wielkopolski, Poland (2000)

Traffic

Road 
To the west of the town the national roads B183a and B184 intersect.

Rail transport 
Delitzsch has an "upper station" with two platforms and a "lower station" with three tracks. Both stations are in the tariff zone 165 of the regional public transport network (Mitteldeutscher Verkehrsverbund). Since December 2008 the two stations have been served Mitteldeutsche Regionalbahn ("Central German regional railway" (MRB)) in addition to Deutsche Bahn (DB), services to and from Delitzsch oberer Bahnhof have been taken over by Abellio in 2015. The upper station is served by regional trains hourly on weekdays, two-hourly on weekends. The lower station is served by S-Bahn Mitteldeutschland and by regional trains between Leipzig and Magdeburg. Long-distance services can be reached by changing in Leipzig or Halle.

The trains of the MRB take the following route:
Eilenburg - Delitzsch oberer Bahnhof - Halle (Saale) Hauptbahnhof (MRB118)
The DB trains run on the following lines:
Eilenburg - Delitzsch oberer Bahnhof - Halle (Saale) Hauptbahnhof (RB118)
Leipzig Hauptbahnhof - Delitzsch unterer Bahnhof - Bitterfeld - Dessau - Magdeburg (RE13)
Leipzig Hauptbahnhof - Delitzsch unterer Bahnhof - Bitterfeld - Dessau (RB54)
Leipzig Hauptbahnhof - Delitzsch unterer Bahnhof - Bitterfeld - Wittenberg (RB57)
The trains of the S-Bahn Mitteldeutschland take the route:
Gaschwitz - Leipzig-Connewitz - Leipzig City Tunnel - Delitzsch unterer Bahnhof - Bitterfeld (S2)

Air traffic 

Local businesses
The most important industries in Delitzsch included the sugar and confectionery industry. Currently, the Delitzscher Chocolate Factory (acquired on 1 October 2008 by the Halloren Chocolate Factory AG), the EuroMaint Rail GmbH (former rail car plant SFW Delitzsch GmbH), URSA Insulation and the Smurfit Kappa Corrugated board plant are the major industrial employers. Most of these big companies are located in the industrial area on the south-west side.

Due to the EU production quotas for sugar, the sugar factory (Südzucker) was shut down in 2001.

Lignite mining was discontinued in the early 1990s, the remaining mines are planned to be a system of lakes and heathland in an arc from the southwest to the north.

Sights 

 Baroque castle with Lustgarten (pleasure gardens), formerly temporary residence and administrative centre, later dower of the Dukes of Saxony-Merseburg, built on the foundations of a medieval moated castle
 kennel gardens, terraced green space created between the city wall and moat (re-opened to visitors in 2010)
 fortifications dating back to the 14th and 15th century with two towers, defensive wall, and water-filled moat
 rose garden
 city church of St. Peter & Paul, brick church of the 15th century with significant high altar
 memorial to Hermann Schulze-Delitzsch
 executioner's house (resident executioner first documented in 1619)
 Stadtschreiberhaus, former home and workplace of the town clerk, now a gallery
 city park with water basin
 zoological gardens

Sports 
Among the many sports clubs in North Saxony district town, among other things, the annual sporting events like the LVZ Bicycle Ride, Delitzsch moves or the old town race. More than 13 sports clubs are based in the region of Delitzsch. Some of the clubs:

 1. SV Concordia Delitzsch
 NHV Concordia Delitzsch 2010 e.V. (second handball club)
 GSVE Delitzsch 1995 e.V. (volleyball club)
 Delitzscher Sportfüchse 1995 e.V. (judo club)
 1.FC Delitzsch 2010 e.V. (football club)
 RV Germania Delitzsch 1891 e.V. (bicycle club)
 Korean Tigers 1989 e.V. (Taekwondoverein)
 Delitzscher tennis club 1921 e.V.
 Badminton club Delitzsch
 Dive club Delitzsch 1958 e.v.

Education 

The first school was built around 1426 as a boys school and was expanded in the 16th century to cater for girls. Today more than 3,500 students learn in ten public and three private schools.
These include three primary schools, two Mittelschulen (secondary schools), one grammar school, two colleges and two special schools. The School of Music, the Adult high school and the acting school are private schools.

 Primary schools
 Primary school Diesterweg
 Primary school on Rosenweg
 Primary school Delitzsch-East
 Middle schools
 Artur Becker- Middle School
 Middle School Delitzsch-North
 Grammar school
 Christian-Gottfried-Ehrenberg-Grammar School
 Technical and vocational schools
 School of Social Sciences
 Vocational School Dr. Hermann Schulze-Delitzsch
 Special schools
 Special Educationscool Rödgen - school for mentally disabled
 Pestalozzischool – school to promote learning
 Other schools
 Delitzsch Music School
 Theatre Academy Saxony (Acting School)
 Adult high school

Notable people 

 Erich Bauer (1890–1970), student historians
 Lucas Brandis (c. 1450–1500) and his brothers, Moritz, Mark, and Matthew Brandis (died after 1512), important early book printers
 Max Bruning (1887–1968), painter, born in the house market 20
 Carl August Ehrenberg (1801–1849), botanist and plant collector
 Christian Gottfried Ehrenberg (1795–1876), bioscientist who co-discovered the use of bacteria in medicine
 Bernhard Förster (1843–1889), high school teacher, cultural critic and husband of Elizabeth (Forester) Nietzsche
 Joachim Fritsche (born 1951), football player in the East German league and played from 1973 to 1977 in the GDR national team
 Paul Fürbringer (1849–1930), physician
 Carl Hugo Gutsche (1843–1926), Missionary & Founder of the German Baptist Church in South Africa from 1867. He was the first of the South African 'Gutsche' dynasty who later went to found and grow the Coca-Cola bottling brand in South and East Africa from the 1940s. Thus was primarily done under Carl Hugo's grandson, Philipp Hugo Gutsche
 Clementine Helm (1825–1896), children's and youth book author
 Katrin Huss (born 1969), moderator
 Lutz Mack (born 1952), gymnast
 Siegfried Mehnert (born 1963), boxer
 Ernst Friedrich Pfotenhauer (1771–1843), jurist
 Eberhard Ruhmer (1917–1996), art historian and curator, son of the city minister Wilhelm Ruhmer
 Christian Saalbach (1653–1713), professor and poet, born in the district Schenkenberg
 Erasmus Schmidt (1570–1637), mathematician and philologist
 Helmut Schreyer (1912–1984), German telecommunications specialist, inventor and professor at the Technical College of the Brazilian army in Rio de Janeiro
 Hermann Schulze-Delitzsch (1808–1883), founder of the German cooperative system and politician, was born in the house market 11 (plaque). In 1848 as Prussian delegate he added the city name to his to be better distinguished from other delegates by this name.
 Walter Tiemann (1876–1951), book artist and graphic designer
 Anna Zammert (1898–1982), German politician and Gewerkschaftsfunktionärin

External links 

Website of Delitzsch - in German
Website of GSVE Delitzsch - in German

References 

 
Nordsachsen